Alex Kuznetsov (born February 5, 1987) is a retired American professional tennis player. He is a former hitting partner of Maria Sharapova.

Personal life
Kuznetsov was born in Ukraine. His family moved to the United States when he was three years old, settling just outside Philadelphia.

He now resides in Tampa, Florida, where he trains at Saddlebrook Resort Club with John Isner and Tim Smyczek. He is married and enjoys playing golf in his spare time.

Kuznetsov is not related to Russian tennis players Svetlana Kuznetsova or Andrey Kuznetsov.

Tennis career

Juniors
Kuznetsov was coached by Jason Katzer during his youth. As a junior, Kuznetsov compiled a singles win–loss record of 67–27 (50-21 in doubles), reaching a combined junior world ranking of number 4 in July 2004.

Junior Slam results – Singles:

Australian Open: -
French Open: F (2004)
Wimbledon: 2R (2004)
US Open: 3R (2005)

Nike offered Kuznetsov a one-million dollar sponsorship contract as soon as he turned pro, which he accepted.

He was involved in a serious car accident soon after. Projected to take a full year to recover from breaking his femur due, he returned to tennis just six months later after having a titanium rod inserted into his right thigh.

2006
In July 2006, Kuznetsov played in the Comerica Challenger in Aptos, defeating Go Soeda for the 2006 singles title. At the 2006 US Open, he lost to fourteenth seed Tommy Haas.

That same year, Kuznetsov appeared in the video game Top Spin 2 as an up-and-coming star.

2007

Kuznetsov reached the second round of the 2007 Australian Open, defeating Australian Peter Luczak before losing to fellow American James Blake, 6–4, 6–1, 6–2. Kuznetsov gave Blake an early scare by breaking Blake's first two service games.

In April 2007, he reached his career-high singles ranking of World number 158.

In the 2007 US Open he played doubles with American Jesse Levine. They won their first round match over Dominik Hrbatý of Slovakia and Harel Levy of Israel, 6–1, 6–4, and their second round match, upsetting seventh-seeded Frenchmen Arnaud Clément and Michaël Llodra 7–6(5), 6–4, before losing in the third round to ninth-seeded Czechs Lukáš Dlouhý and Pavel Vízner, 6–4, 7–5.

In December, Kuznetsov, Levine, and Wayne Odesnik were invited by the USTA to play off in a round-robin for the wild-card berth in the Australian Open.  Levine won the wild card.

Performance timelines

Singles 
Current through 2015 Australian Open.

Doubles
Current till US Open.

References

External links
 
 
 
 The official website of Alex Kuznetsov

1987 births
Living people
American male tennis players
Ukrainian emigrants to the United States
People from Bucks County, Pennsylvania
Tennis people from Pennsylvania